Alien Mom, Alien Dad is a South Korean television entertainment program, where celebrities, who are known for their unique personalities, show their daily lives which their children respond and react to.

Broadcasting period

Cast

Former cast

Special cast

Guest appearances

Ratings

2018

References 

Korean-language television shows
Korean Broadcasting System original programming
South Korean reality television series
2018 South Korean television series debuts